Kevin Dekkers (born 9 December 1980) is an Irish-born, Sint Maartener international footballer who plays as a midfielder for the Sint Maarten national football team.

International career
Dekkers was born in County Cork, Ireland to a Dutch father and Sint Maartener mother, who ensured that Kevin maintained his Sint Maartenese citizenship. He moved to the island itself in 2004, and worked as a PE teacher, playing in the local league. He was called up to the Sint Maarten senior squad for a friendly against Anguilla, and captained the side to a 2–0 victory. He also played in 2017 Caribbean Cup qualification games against Grenada and the United States Virgin Islands.

Career statistics

International

References

External links
 CaribbeanFootballDatabase Profile

1980 births
Living people
Republic of Ireland association footballers
Dutch Antillean footballers
Sint Maarten international footballers
Association football midfielders
People from Bandon, County Cork